Love, War and the Ghost of Whitey Ford is the fifth solo studio album by American recording artist Everlast. It was released on September 23, 2008 via his own record label Martyr Inc, with distribution by Hickory Records/Sony/ATV Music Publishing. This album sees Everlast moving away from hip hop in favor of alternative rock and blues. The album peaked at number 15 on the Swiss music charts, number 61 in Germany, number 78 on the U.S. Billboard 200, and number 132 in France.

The record included singles and videos for "Letter Home from the Garden of Stone", which was available for free download via martyr-inc.com in December 2007, a DJ Muggs-produced cover track of Johnny Cash's "Folsom Prison Blues", which was released to download on August 19, and the final "Stone in My Hand", which debuted on the martyr-inc.com website on October 28, 2008 and later made its appearance in 2011 film Drive Angry. All the tracks from the album were written and produced by Keefus Ciancia and Everlast himself, except for "Naked" produced by DJ Lethal, and "Folsom Prison Blues".

Track listing

Notes
 Tracks 18 and 19 are from the European releases only.
"Folsom Prison Blues" is a cover song of "Folsom Prison Blues" as written and performed by Johnny Cash from 1957 album With His Hot and Blue Guitar
"My Medicine (Demo)" is a songwriter's cover song of "My Medicine" as co-written by Calvin Broadus and originally performed by Snoop Dogg from 2008 album Ego Trippin'
"Maybe" is from the 2004 release White Trash Beautiful
Samples
 "Folsom Prison Blues" contains elements of "Insane in the Brain" by Cypress Hill (1993) and "Here We Go (Live at the Funhouse)" by Run-DMC (1985)
 "Die in Yer' Arms" contains elements of "Goin' Out West" by Tom Waits (1992)

Personnel
Erik Francis Schrody – vocals, guitar, piano, turntables, programming, producer 
Keith Ciancia – bass, drums, keyboards, piano, programming, engineer, producer 
Leor DiMant – producer (track 8)
Lawrence Muggerud – producer (track 2)
Brian Gardner – mastering
Shawn Everett – mixing
Daniel O'Connor – artwork
Geoff Gallegos – conductor

Charts

References

External links

2008 albums
Albums produced by DJ Lethal
Albums produced by DJ Muggs
Alternative rock albums by American artists
Blues albums by American artists
Everlast (musician) albums